AAR CORP. is a private provider of aviation services.

AAR is headquartered in Wood Dale, Illinois, a Chicago suburb near O'Hare International Airport. The company employs 4,700 people worldwide.

History
AAR Corp was founded in 1951.

I.A. Allen Industrial was incorporated in 1955, renamed Allen Aircraft Radio in 1962, and became AAR CORP. in 1970. The company was founded by Ira A. Eichner. Also, in 1969, AAR began its aircraft maintenance business in Oklahoma City. In 1965, AAR expanded to Europe and opened a Singapore office in 1982.

AAR organized its Aircraft Turbine Center, Inc. in 1979 after future CEO David P. Storch, Eichner's son-in-law, joined the company.

David P. Storch was  CEO from 1996 to 2018. In 2018, John M. Holmes became CEO.

In 2017, AAR was chosen as the prime contractor for a 15-year, $909 million landing gear award to provide total supply-chain management to support all U.S. Air Force and contractor requisitions received for all C-130, KC-135 & E-3 landing gear parts.

In September 2019, the U.S. Naval Air Systems Command awarded AAR a $118M contract for procuring, modifying, and delivering two C-40 aircraft to the U.S. Marine Corps.

During the Trump administration, AAR quadrupled its lobbying expenditures. The company spent large sums at Trump-owned properties with the intent to get Trump to view the company more favorably. From the time Trump took office until October 2020, AAR obtained 10 new federal contracts worth a total of $1.35 billion.

In response to the COVID-19 pandemic, AAR began using augmented reality in their warehouses to facilitate socially-distanced communications and conduct FAA site visits and audits. They are also piloting the use of drones to assist in inspections.

In March 2021, AAR publicly announced the first all-female class of technicians in training at Miami International Airport.

In April 2021, AAR signed a multi-year agreement with United Airlines to provide heavy maintenance services in Rockford, Illinois. AAR plans to add up to 250 more aviation maintenance technician (AMT) jobs at the facility to meet increased demand from United.

AAR is working with Embry-Riddle Aeronautical University in developing the first maintenance SkillBridge program. AAR has partnered with VIPER (Veteran Internships Providing Employment Readiness) to train veterans for careers in the aviation industry.

Financial Trends
Annual financial highlights (U.S. Dollars in millions except per share data):

See also
 List of S&P 600 companies

References

External links
 

Companies listed on the New York Stock Exchange
Aircraft engineering companies
Aerospace companies of the United States
American companies established in 1951
Transport companies established in 1951
Companies based in DuPage County, Illinois
Defense companies of the United States
1951 establishments in Illinois